Ann Radcliffe (née Ward; 9 July 1764 – 7 February 1823) was an English novelist and a pioneer of Gothic fiction. Her technique of explaining apparently supernatural elements in her novels has been credited with gaining respectability for Gothic fiction in the 1790s. Radcliffe was the most popular writer of her day and almost universally admired; contemporary critics called her the mighty enchantress and the Shakespeare of romance-writers, and her popularity continued through the 19th century. Interest has revived in the early 21st century, with the publication of three biographies.

Biography

Early life 
Radcliffe was born Ann Ward in Holborn, London on 9 July 1764. She was the only child to William Ward (1737-1798) and Ann Oates (1726-1800), and her mother was 36 years old when she gave birth. Her father worked as a haberdasher in London before moving the family to Bath in 1772 to take over management of a porcelain shop for his business partners Thomas Bentley and Josiah Wedgwood. Both of her parents were relatively well connected. Her father had a famous uncle, William Cheselden, who was Surgeon to King George II, and her mother descended from the De Witt family of Holland and had a cousin, Sir Richard Jebb, who was a fashionable London physician.

Growing up, Radcliffe often visited her maternal uncle, Thomas Bentley, in Chelsea, London and later Turnham Green. Bentley was business partners with a fellow Unitarian, Josiah Wedgwood, maker of the Wedgwood China. Sukey, Wedgwood's daughter, also stayed in Chelsea and is Radcliffe's only known childhood companion. Sukey later married Dr. Robert Darwin and had a son, the naturalist Charles Darwin. Although mixing in some distinguished circles, Radcliffe seems to have made little impression in this society and was described by Wedgwood as "Bentley's shy niece".

Marriage 
In 1787, when Ann was 23 years old, she married William Radcliffe (1763-1830), who was an Oxford-educated journalist. William had initially been a student of law, but he didn’t complete his legal studies and instead turned his attention to literature and journalism. Ann and William were married in Bath but soon after moved to London where William got a job working for a paper. William wrote for (and would soon become the editor of) the Gazetteer and New Daily Advertiser, which was a campaigning newspaper that "celebrated the French Revolution, freedom of the press, and Dissenter’s rights."

Ann and William never had children. By all accounts, theirs was a happy marriage. Radcliffe called him her "nearest relative and friend". According to Talfourd's memoir, Ann started writing while her husband remained out late most evenings for work. She published her first novel, The Castles of Athlin and Dunbayne, in 1789 at the age of 25, and she would go on to publish her next four novels in short succession. The money she earned from her novels later allowed her husband to quit his job, and the two of them travelled together, along with their dog, Chance. In 1794, they went to the Netherlands and Germany. This was her only trip abroad, and it became the inspiration for a travelog that she published a year later. On this trip, Ann and William were actually meant to go on to Switzerland, but this plan was “frustrated by a disobliging official, who refused to believe that they were English, and would not honor their passports." In 1795, William returned as editor of the Gazetteer, and a year later, he purchased the English Chronicle or Universal Evening Post, which was a Whig newspaper. Ann published The Italian in 1797, and it would be the last novel published in her lifetime. She was paid £800 for it, which was three times her husband’s yearly income.

Later life 
In her final years, Radcliffe retreated from public life and was rumoured to have gone insane as a result of her writing. These rumours arose because Radcliffe seemingly abandoned writing after publishing her fifth novel and vanished from the public eye. While these rumours were later proven false, they were so popular that Talfourd’s memoir actually included a statement from her physician that spoke about her mental condition in her later years. Radcliffe remained secluded for 26 years, with no real explanation available to her many fans. However, this supposed seclusion is contradicted in The New Monthly Magazine, which states that the tenor of Mrs Radcliffe's life was characterized by the rare union of the literary gentlewoman and the active housewife. Instead of being in confinement in Derbyshire, as had been asserted, she was seen, every Sunday, at St James's Church; almost every fine day in Hyde Park; sometimes at the theatres, and very frequently at the Opera.

Radcliffe spent the rest of her adult life travelling and living a comfortable life with her husband and their dog, Chance. They travelled domestically almost once a year from 1797-1811, and in later years, when they had stopped doing distant excursions, Ann and William would hire a carriage during the summer months so that they could make trips to places near London. Radcliffe did continue to write. She wrote poetry and another novel, Gaston de Blondeville, but this novel was not published until after her lifetime. She was said to have suffered from asthma for which she received regular treatment.

Death and Posthumous Work 
In 1823, Radcliffe went to Ramsgate, but it was here that she caught a chest infection which caused her death. She died 7 February 1823 at the age of 58 and was buried in a vault in the Chapel of Ease at St George's, Hanover Square, London. Although she had suffered from asthma for twelve years previously, her modern biographer, Rictor Norton, cites the description given by her physician, Dr. Scudamore, of how "a new inflammation seized the membranes of the brain," which led to "violent symptoms" and argues that they suggest a "bronchial infection, leading to pneumonia, high fever, delirium and death."

Shortly after her death, Gaston de Blondeville was published by Henry Colburn, featuring A Memoir for the Authoress, the first known biographical piece on Radcliffe. It also contained some of her poetry and her essay "On the Supernatural in Poetry," which outlines her distinction between terror and horror.

Christina Rossetti attempted to write a biography of Radcliffe in 1883, but abandoned it for lack of information. For 50 years, biographers stayed away from her as a subject, agreeing with Rossetti's estimation. Rictor Norton, author of Mistress of Udolpho: The Life of Ann Radcliffe (1999), argues that those 50 years were "dominated by interpretation rather than scholarship" where information (specifically on her rumoured madness) was repeated rather than traced to a reliable source.

Literary life
Radcliffe published five novels during her lifetime, which she always referred to as "romances". Her first novel, The Castles of Athlin and Dubnayne, was published anonymously in 1789. Early reviewers were mostly unenthusiastic about it. The Monthly Review said that, while the novel was commendable for its morality, it appealed only to women and children: "To men who have passed, or even attained, the meridian of life, a series of events, which seem not to have their foundation in nature, will ever be insipid, if not disgustful”. It was also largely criticized for its anachronisms and inauthentic renderings of the Highlands.

One year later, Radcliffe published her second novel, A Sicilian Romance, which also received little attention. In 1791, she published her third novel, The Romance of the Forest. Like her first two novels, this book was initially published anonymously. On the original title page, it stated that the novel was “By the Authoress of A Sicilian Romance”. The Romance of the Forest was popular with readers, and in the second edition, Radcliffe began adding her own name to the title page.

In 1794, three years later, Radcliffe published The Mysteries of Udolpho. At a time when the average amount earned by an author for a manuscript was £10, her publishers, G. G. and J. Robinson, bought the copyright for this novel for £500, and it was a runaway success. The money from this novel allowed her and her husband to travel to the Netherlands and Germany, which she described in her travelogue A Journey Made in the Summer of 1794 (1795). She published The Italian in 1797, and it was the last novel published in her lifetime. Cadell and Davies paid £800 making Radcliffe the highest-paid professional writer of the 1790s. This novel was written in response to Matthew Gregory Lewis's The Monk because Radcliffe did not like the direction in which Gothic literature was heading. One critic, Nick Groom, writes that, in The Italian, Radcliffe "takes the violence and eroticism that so titillated readers of The Monk and subsumes them beneath the veil and the cowl of oppressive Catholicism."

A final novel, Gaston de Blondeville was published posthumously in 1826. This novel was published with Talfourd's memoir and Radcliffe's unfinished essay "On the Supernatural in Poetry", which details the difference between the sensation of terror her works aimed to achieve and the horror Lewis sought to evoke. Radcliffe stated that terror aims to stimulate readers through imagination and perceived evils while horror closes them off through fear and physical dangers: "Terror and Horror are so far opposite, that the first expands the soul and awakens the faculties to a high degree of life; the other contracts, freezes and nearly annihilates them."

Radcliffe portrayed her female characters as equal to male characters, allowing them to dominate and overtake the typically powerful male villains and heroes, creating new roles for women in literature previously not available. Radcliffe was also known for including supernatural elements but eventually giving readers a rational explanation for the supernatural. Usually, Radcliffe would reveal the logical excuse for what first appeared to be supernatural towards the end of her novels, which led to heightened suspense. Some critics/readers found this disappointing and felt duped. Perhaps the most eloquent complaint against the trope was penned by Walter Scott in his Lives of the Novelists (1821–1824). Regarding Radcliffe’s penchant for explaining the supernatural, he writes: “A stealthy step behind the arras may, doubtless, in some situations, and when the nerves are tuned to a certain pitch, have no small influence upon the imagination; but if the conscious listener discovers it to be only the noise made by the cat, the solemnity of the feeling is gone, and the visionary is at once angry with his sense for having been cheated, and with his reason for having acquiesced in the deception." Some modern critics have been frustrated by her work, as she fails to include "real ghosts". This could be motivated by the idea that works in the Romantic period, from the late 18th century to the mid-19th century, had to undermine Enlightenment values such as rationalism and realism.

Anti-Catholicism
Radcliffe's work have been considered by some scholars to be part of a larger tradition of anti-Catholicism within Gothic literature; her works contain hostile portrayals of both Catholicism and Catholics. The Italian frequently presents Catholicism, the largest religion in Italy, in a negative light. In the novel, Radcliffe portrays Catholic elements such as the Inquisition in a negative light, pointing to its discriminatory practises against non-Catholics. Radcliffe also portrays the confessional as a "danger zone" controlled by the power of the priest and the church. The Mysteries of Udolpho also contained negative portrayals of Catholicism; both novels are set in Catholic-majority Italy, and Catholicism was presented as being part of "ancient Italianess". Italy, along with its Catholicism, had been featured in earlier Gothic literature; Horace Walpole's novel The Castle of Otranto claimed in-universe that it was "found in the library of an ancient catholic family in the north of England" and "printed at Naples, in the black letter, in the year 1529".

Some scholars have suggested that Radcliffe's anti-Catholicism was partly a response to the 1791 Roman Catholic Relief Act passed by the British parliament, which was a major component of Catholic emancipation in Great Britain. Other scholars have suggested that Radcliffe was ultimately ambivalent towards Catholicism, claiming that she was a Latitudinarian.

Gothic landscapes
Radcliffe used the framing narrative of personifying nature in many of her novels. For example, she believed that the sublime motivated the protagonist to create an image that was more idealistic within the plot. Her elaborate descriptions of landscape were influenced by the painters Claude Lorrain, Nicolas Poussin, and Salvator Rosa. She often wrote about places she had never visited. Lorrain's influence can be seen through Radcliffe's picturesque, romantic descriptions, for example in the first volume of The Mysteries of Udolpho. Rosa's influence can be seen through dark landscapes and elements of the Gothic.

Radcliffe once said of Claude:

Influence on later writers

Radcliffe influenced many later authors, both by inspiring more Gothic fiction and by inspiring parodies. In the eighteenth century, she inspired writers like Matthew Lewis (1775 – 1818) and the Marquis de Sade (1740–1814), who praised her work but produced more intensely violent fiction. Radcliffe is known for having spawned a large number of lesser imitators of the "Radcliffe School", such as Harriet Lee and Catherine Cuthbertson. Jane Austen (1775 – 1817) parodied The Mysteries of Udolpho in Northanger Abbey (1817), and she defined her fiction as a contrast to Radcliffe and writers like her. Scholars have also perceived other apparent allusions to Radcliffe's novels and life in Austen's work.

In the early nineteenth century, Radcliffe influenced Edgar Allan Poe (1809–1849), and Sir Walter Scott (1771–1832). For example, Scott interspersed his work with poems in a similar manner to Radcliffe, and one assessment of her reads, "Scott himself said that her prose was poetry and her poetry was prose. She was, indeed, a prose poet, in both the best and the worst senses of the phrase. The romantic landscape, the background, is the best thing in all her books; the characters are two dimensional, the plots far fetched and improbable, with 'elaboration of means and futility of result'." Later in the nineteenth century, Charlotte and Emily Brontë continued Radcliffe's Gothic tradition with their novels Jane Eyre, Villette, and Wuthering Heights.

Radcliffe was also admired by French authors like Honoré de Balzac (1799 – 1850), Victor Hugo (1802 – 1885), Alexandre Dumas (1802 – 1870), and Charles Baudelaire (1821 – 1867). Honoré de Balzac's novel of the supernatural L'Héritière de Birague (1822) follows the tradition of Radcliffe's style and parodies it.

As a child the young Fyodor Dostoyevsky was deeply impressed by Radcliffe. In Winter Notes on Summer Impressions (1863) he writes, "I used to spend the long winter hours before bed listening (for I could not yet read), agape with ecstasy and terror, as my parents read aloud to me from the novels of Ann Radcliffe. Then I would rave deliriously about them in my sleep." A number of scholars have noted elements of Gothic literature in Dostoyevsky's novels, and some have tried to show direct influence of Radcliffe's work.

In 1875, Paul Féval wrote a story starring Radcliffe as a vampire hunter, titled La Ville Vampire: Adventure Incroyable de Madame Anne Radcliffe ("City of Vampires: The Incredible Adventure of Mrs. Anne Radcliffe"), which blends fiction and history. At the last minute a mysterious man on a white horse saves the day, none other than Lord Wellington fresh from the Battle of Waterloo.

Film reference
Helen McCrory plays Ann Radcliffe in the 2007 film Becoming Jane, starring Anne Hathaway as Jane Austen. The film depicts Radcliffe as meeting the young Jane Austen and encouraging her to pursue a literary career. No evidence exists that such a meeting ever occurred.

Books
The Castles of Athlin and Dunbayne (1 vol.) 1789
A Sicilian Romance (2 vols) 1790
The Romance of the Forest (3 vols) 1791
The Mysteries of Udolpho (4 vols) 1794
A Journey Made in the Summer of 1794 (1 vol.) 1795
The Italian (3 vols) 1797
Gaston de Blondeville (4 vols) 1826

References

Further reading

Miles, Robert. Ann Radcliffe: The Great Enchantress. United Kingdom, Manchester University Press, 1995.
McIntyre, Clara Frances. Ann Radcliffe in Relation to Her Time. United Kingdom, Yale University Press, 1920.
Murray, E. B. Ann Radcliffe. Twayne Publishers, Incorporated, New York, 1972.

Rogers, Deborah. The Critical Responses to Ann Radcliffe

External links

 
 
 
 
 
 
 Listing in 'The Literary Gothic'
 Listing in The Victorian Web

1764 births
1823 deaths
18th-century British women writers
18th-century English novelists
18th-century English women
18th-century English people
19th-century English women writers
19th-century English novelists
Anti-Catholicism in the United Kingdom
English horror writers
English women novelists
People from Holborn
Women horror writers
Writers of Gothic fiction